Clondahorky is a parish situated in Donegal, Republic of Ireland. It is in the Diocese of Raphoe. Dunfanaghy is the principal town.

References

Civil parishes of County Donegal